Zoltán Fodor may refer to:
 Zoltán Fodor (wrestler)
 Zoltan Fodor (physicist)